The 1952 Honduran Amateur League was the sixth edition of the Honduran Amateur League.  Club Aduana Deportivo obtained its 1st national title.  The season ran from 6 April to 19 October 1952.

Regional champions
For the first time the department of Choluteca included a team to participate in the national championship.

Known results

National championship round
Played in a single round-robin format between the regional champions.  Also known as the Pentagonal.

Known results

Aduana's lineup

References

Liga Amateur de Honduras seasons
Honduras
1952 in Honduras